Ray Enright (March 25, 1896 – April 3, 1965) was an American film director. He directed 73 films between 1927–53, many of them for Warner Bros. He oversaw comedy films like Joe E. Brown vehicles, five of the six informal pairings of Joan Blondell and Glenda Farrell, and later directed a number of Westerns, many featuring Randolph Scott. Enright was born in Anderson, Indiana, and died in Hollywood, California, from a heart attack.

Partial filmography

As director

Tracked by the Police (1927)
Jaws of Steel (1927)
The Girl from Chicago (1927)
Domestic Troubles (1928)
Song of the West (1930)
Golden Dawn (1930)
Dancing Sweeties (1930)
Scarlet Pages (1930)
Play Girl (1932)
Blondie Johnson (1933)
Tomorrow at Seven (1933)
Havana Widows (1933)
I've Got Your Number (1934)
Twenty Million Sweethearts (1934)
The Circus Clown (1934)
Dames (1934)
The St. Louis Kid (1934)
While the Patient Slept (1935)
Traveling Saleslady (1935)
Alibi Ike (1935)
Miss Pacific Fleet (1935)
We're in the Money (1935)
Snowed Under (1936)
Earthworm Tractors (1936)
China Clipper (1936)
Ready, Willing, and Able (1937)
Slim (1937)
The Singing Marine (1937)
Swing Your Lady (1938)
Gold Diggers in Paris (1938)
Hard to Get (1938)
Going Places (1938)
The Angels Wash Their Faces (1939)
On Your Toes (1939)
Brother Rat and a Baby (1940)
Teddy, the Rough Rider (1940 short)
An Angel from Texas (1940)
The Wagons Roll at Night (1941)
Bad Men of Missouri (1941)
Law of the Tropics (1941)
Wild Bill Hickok Rides (1942)
The Spoilers (1942)
Sin Town (1942)
Gung Ho! (1943)
China Sky (1945)
Man Alive (1945)
One Way to Love (1946)
Trail Street (1947)
Albuquerque (1948)
Coroner Creek (1948)
Return of the Bad Men (1948)
South of St. Louis (1949)
Montana (1950)
Kansas Raiders (1950)
Flaming Feather (1952)
The Man from Cairo (1953)

As screenwriter
Gold Dust Gertie (1931)
Side Show (1931)

References

External links

1896 births
1965 deaths
Burials at Forest Lawn Memorial Park (Glendale)
Film directors from Indiana
People from Anderson, Indiana